SRN1 may refer to:

SR-N1, the first practical hovercraft
SR N1 class, a class of locomotives
Radical-nucleophilic aromatic substitution (SRN1), a type of substitution reaction in organic chemistry